Lackenby is a small village in Redcar and Cleveland, North Yorkshire, England. It is situated to the immediate east of Eston and Middlesbrough and immediately to the west of Lazenby.

References

Redcar and Cleveland
Places in the Tees Valley
Villages in North Yorkshire